Nettle Creek is a stream located entirely within the borders of Champaign County, Ohio.

Nettle Creek most likely was named for the thorny nettle plants encountered there.

See also
List of rivers of Ohio

References

Rivers of Champaign County, Ohio
Rivers of Ohio